Adama Guira (born 24 April 1988) is a Burkinabé professional footballer who plays as a midfielder for Chinese club Qingdao Hainiu and the Burkina Faso national team.

Club career
Born in Bobo-Dioulasso, Guira has played club football in Burkina Faso, Spain, Sweden, Moldova and Denmark for RC Bobo Dioulasso, Gavà, Alicante, Logroñés, Djurgården, Dacia Chișinău and SønderjyskE.

In July 2017, Guira returned to Denmark and joined AGF. He left the club two years later, to join Hong Kong Premier League club R&F. On 14 October 2020, Guira left the club after his club's withdrawal from the HKPL in the new season.

On 6 February 2021, Guira returned to SønderjyskE in Denmark, on a deal for the rest of the season. He left the club again at the end of the contract. He then signed for Racing Rioja.

International career
Guira made his international debut for Burkina Faso in 2010. He was selected as part of Burkina Faso's preliminary squad for the 2015 Africa Cup of Nations.

Honors
Burkina Faso
Africa Cup of Nations bronze: 2017

References

1988 births
Living people
People from Bobo-Dioulasso
Burkinabé footballers
Association football midfielders
Burkina Faso international footballers
2015 Africa Cup of Nations players
2017 Africa Cup of Nations players
2021 Africa Cup of Nations players
Segunda División B players
Allsvenskan players
Danish Superliga players
Ligue 2 players
Hong Kong Premier League players
RC Bobo Dioulasso players
CF Gavà players
Alicante CF footballers
UD Logroñés players
Djurgårdens IF Fotboll players
FC Dacia Chișinău players
SønderjyskE Fodbold players
RC Lens players
Aarhus Gymnastikforening players
R&F (Hong Kong) players
Racing Rioja CF players
Burkinabé expatriate footballers
Expatriate footballers in Spain
Expatriate footballers in Sweden
Expatriate footballers in Moldova
Expatriate men's footballers in Denmark
Expatriate footballers in Hong Kong
Burkinabé expatriate sportspeople in Spain
Burkinabé expatriate sportspeople in Sweden
Burkinabé expatriate sportspeople in Moldova
Burkinabé expatriate sportspeople in Denmark
Burkinabé expatriate sportspeople in Hong Kong
Moldovan Super Liga players
21st-century Burkinabé people
Qingdao Hainiu F.C. (1990) players
Burkinabé expatriate sportspeople in China
Expatriate footballers in China